Quackser Fortune Has a Cousin in the Bronx is a 1970 Irish-American comedy film directed by Waris Hussein and written by Gabriel Walsh. It stars Gene Wilder as the title character, a poor Irish manure collector who falls in love with an American exchange student (Margot Kidder) after she almost runs him over.

Plot

In Dublin, a working-class family has been unsuccessful in convincing their son to get a real job: the son prefers his job of scooping up horse's dung and selling it for flower gardens. An American exchange student almost runs him over and gets to know him. The dung man has ignored warnings from his family and suddenly the horses have been banned from Dublin. His new love is leaving for America and he must find a way to cope with the new reality.

Cast
Gene Wilder as Aloysius "Quackser" Fortune
Margot Kidder as Zazel Pierce
Eileen Colgan as Betsy Bourke
Seamus Forde as Mr. Fortune
May Ollis as Mrs. Fortune
Liz Davis as Kathleen Fortune
Caroline Tully as Vera Fortune
David Kelly as Tom Maguire
David Davin-Power (uncredited extra)

Nomination
The film was nominated for Best Comedy Written Directly for the Screen (WGA Award – Screen) at the Writers Guild of America, awards in 1971.

Home media
The film was released on DVD on September 7, 1999.

References

External links

1970 films
Irish romantic comedy-drama films
1970s romantic comedy-drama films
Films directed by Waris Hussein
Films set in Dublin (city)
Films shot in Dublin (city)
21st Century Film Corporation films
1970s English-language films